Arend Willem Langenberg (19 January 1949 – 30 December 2012) was a Dutch voice-over, voice actor and radio presenter. He died at the age of 63 from colon cancer.

Early life
Arend Langenberg began his career in November 1970 at the offshore station Radio Veronica a station that has stopped broadcasting in 1974, he continued his career as news anchor by the news agency ANP that has been broadcast on Hilversum I, II and III at that time. After this he was to be a transition to the NOB to head of the gramophone library. At the weekend he kept the news on Radio 538 and Sky Radio. A while later, he picked up again fanatically on the new reading and he found himself at the head of the news department at the Sky Radio Group. By Classic FM, it was at this time next station which he can be heard as a presenter. In 2003 he signed an exclusive contract with Sky Radio, which he could no longer work for Radio 538, that station started an own news service.

Besides radio duties conferred Langenberg his voice to several other programs and commercials, including the program Peter R. de Vries, crime reporter. In 2009 he worked as the famous newscaster in the feature film  director Martijn van Nellestijn.

Disease and death
In early 2008 it was announced that he was suffering from Colorectal cancer; at the end of 2008 he continues his work again. He died on 30 December 2012, and was buried on 4 January 2013.

References

External links
 

1949 births
2012 deaths
Deaths from cancer in the Netherlands
Deaths from colorectal cancer
Dutch male radio actors
Dutch radio news presenters
Dutch radio presenters
Dutch male voice actors
Male actors from Amsterdam
People from Hilversum